Cantejeira is a locality located in the municipality of Balboa, León, in León province, Castile and León, Spain. As of 2020, it has a population of 36.

Geography 
Cantejeira is located 155km west of León, Spain.

References

Populated places in the Province of León